Paris, Palace Hotel is a 1956 French-Italian romantic comedy film directed by Henri Verneuil and starring Charles Boyer, Françoise Arnoul and Tilda Thamar.

It was shot in Eastmancolor at the Boulogne Studios in Paris. The film's sets were designed by the art director Jean d'Eaubonne.

Synopsis
A manicurist working at a luxurious hotel in Paris and a young garage mechanic there to pick up a customer's luxury car, both pretend to be wealthy residents to impress each other with the friendly assistance Henri Delormel, one of the real guests at the hotel.

Cast
 Charles Boyer as Henri Delormel
 Françoise Arnoul as Françoise Noblet
 Roberto Risso as Gérard Necker dit Brugnon
 Tilda Thamar as Madeleine Delormel
 Georges Chamarat as Alexandre - le coiffeur
 Louis Seigner as Marcel Brugnon
 Simone Bach as Barbara - la brune en robe rouge
 Darry Cowl as Jules Hoyoyo
 Jacques Jouanneau as Le laquais de l'entrée
 Jean Clarieux as Un responsable du réveillon surprise
 Robert Dalban as L'organisateur du réveillon
 Max Elloy as Un maître d'hôtel
 René Génin as Le père Noël
 Gabriel Gobin as Le brigadier
 Jacques Hilling as Le cuistot
 Georges Lannes as Monsieur Desmoulins - un client
 Jacques Marin a sLe livreur de fleurs au Palace
 Raoul Marco as Le monsieur 'pince fesse'
 Jean Ozenne as Albert - le réceptionniste de jour du Palace
 Robert Pizani as Georges - le maître d'hôtel du palace
 Albert Rémy as Le ronfleur du commissariat
 Julien Carette as Bébert
 Michèle Philippe as Barbara
 Raymond Bussières as Soupape - le garagiste
 Gina Manès as 	L'Alouette - la chiffonnière de la cellule
 Andréa Parisy as Une manucure
 Robert Seller as Le réceptionniste de nuit du Palace

References

Bibliography 
 Parish, James Robert. Film Actors Guide: Western Europe. Scarecrow Press, 1977.

External links 
 

1956 films
1956 romantic comedy films
French romantic comedy films
Italian romantic comedy films
1950s French-language films
Films directed by Henri Verneuil
Films shot at Boulogne Studios
Films set in Paris
1950s French films
1950s Italian films